General Norris may refer to:

Frank Kingsley Norris (1893–1984), Australian Army major general
Robert W. Norris (born 1932), U.S. Air Force major general
Tracy R. Norris (fl. 1980s–2020s), Texas National Guard major general
William C. Norris (general) (born 1926), U.S. Air Force major general